Mungo National Park is a protected national park that is located in south-western New South Wales, in eastern Australia. Mungo National Park is the traditional meeting place of the Muthi Muthi, Nyiampaar and Barkinji Aboriginal Nations. People are no longer able to climb the sand dunes by themselves as stricter rules have been enforced, all visitors groups need to be accompanied by an accredited tour guide to access the sand dunes.

The national park is part of the UNESCO World Heritagelisted Willandra Lakes Region, an area of  that incorporates seventeen dry lakes. The seventeen dry lakes are not all called Mungo but are all declared world heritage. The creek that used to flow into Mungo is being preserved as a sacred site. The roads to, in or around the park are unsealed and can be accessed in 2-wheel-drive cars, but councils will close the road in wet weather.

Features and location
The central feature of Mungo National Park is Lake Mungo, the second largest of the ancient dry lakes. The Mungo National Park is noted for the archaeological remains discovered in the park. The remains of Mungo Man, the oldest human remains discovered in Australia, and Mungo Lady, the oldest known human to have been ritually cremated, were both discovered within the park. They were buried on the shore of Lake Mungo, beneath the 'Walls of China', a series of lunettes on the South eastern edge of the lake.

A visitor centre, where further information and a map may be acquired, is located near the old Mungo woolshed and the entrance to the park. A  signposted circular vehicle track allows visitors to drive to the spectacular Walls of China and around the lakes. The Shearers' Quarters can provide bunk accommodation and a communal kitchen for a daily fee. Camping and park access fees may be paid at the visitor centre.

Mungo National Park was acquired for the National Reserve System in 1979 by the Foundation for National Parks and Wildlife. This organisation fundraised the $101,000 required to purchase the property. The Foundation also funded a resident archaeologist to work on the site from 1979 to 1983. With funds donated by Dick Smith, the Foundation established the Mungo Visitors Centre and Laboratory in 1983. , the Foundation put together a prospectus to create a new Centre at Mungo for education and research. Glenn Murcutt, an Australian architect and winner of the 2002 Pritzker Prize and 2009 AIA Gold Medal, along with Wendy Lewin, were scheduled to design the building.

Accommodation 
The National Park campground provides accommodation for visiting residents.

An Eco lodge provides cabin accommodation, caravan sites and glamping. There is also a restaurant and bar onsite, tours can be booked at the lodge.

See also

 Protected areas of New South Wales

References

External links
 
 
 
 
 
 Mungo Lodge - Frequently asked questions

National parks of New South Wales
Protected areas established in 1979
1979 establishments in Australia